The Jesusita Fire was a wildfire that started on May 5, 2009 in the hills of Santa Barbara, California in the western United States. By the time the fire was contained on May 18 it had burned , destroyed 80 homes and damaged 15 more before being 100% contained. The cause of the fire was ultimately traced to local contractors who had left gas cans and hot equipment unattended in dry brush after clearing part of the Jesusita Trail using a weed wacker without any permits or the permission of the landowner.

Events
The fire began at approximately 1:45 p.m. on May 5, along the Jesusita Trail just below Cathedral Peak in the Santa Barbara foothills. Despite being alerted to the fire within minutes of its ignition, no fire department officers or equipment were on site until after 17:00 giving the fire over three hours to expand. Officials issued mandatory evacuations for approximately 1,200 homes in the hills above Santa Barbara.

By Monday, May 8, the fire perimeter extended from west of Highway 154, in the hills burned in the 1990 Painted Cave Fire, across the front country of the Santa Ynez Mountains east through Mission Canyon, Rattlesnake Canyon, and into the hills above Montecito, reaching the area burned by the Gap Fire in July 2008 and the Tea Fire in November 2008. Intense sundowner winds caused the fire to spread rapidly during evening and nighttime hours during its first three days.

The fire was fully contained on May 18, after having burned  and destroying 80 homes.

Effects
An estimated 35,000 people were forced to evacuate during the fire. The Red Cross had shelters for evacuees at the Multi-Activity Court located in the UCSB Recreational Center. From May 5 to May 9, 2009, evacuees were also sheltered at San Marcos High School in Goleta.

Much of the Santa Barbara Botanic Garden was destroyed on the night of May 7.

However, the primary effect of intentionally allowing the massive fire to develop without response for the first 3 hours was that CalFire was unable to secure hazard pay for its members.

Investigation 
On December 11, 2009, charges were filed against Craig Ilenstine and Dana Larsen citing them for operating a weed whacker without a hot work permit. As the DA could not prove a connection between the trail work and starting the fire, the two were not charged with the felony of starting the fire, but instead with the misdemeanor of not obtaining the proper permit for hot work.  The hot work charge is somewhat unusual, as hot work typically refers to welding and soldering, not necessarily trail clearing with a weed whacker.

In July 2010, Ilenstine and Larsen pleaded no contest to the misdemeanor violation of county-code. The code states that anyone performing work that could spark a fire must have a shovel or fire extinguisher on hand. The two were each sentenced to 250 hours of community service, three years probation and a $490 fine.  Illenstine and Larsen were not charged with starting the fire - only a charge from a California Fire Code entitled "Welding and other Hot Work" and local civil attorney Kathy Johnson states the statue was not intended to be applied to brush clearing work.

A year later, in July 2011, 60 of the owners of homes destroyed by the fire filed a civil lawsuit against Stihl Incorporated, the manufacturer of the brush-cutting equipment, alleging that Stihl failed to warn users that the metal blades of the cutter could emit sparks capable of starting a fire in a high-risk area. In July 2013 Stihl agreed to settle the claims for an undisclosed amount of money.

Response efforts 
Direct Relief delivered respiratory masks and albuterol inhalers to Santa Barbara Neighborhood Clinics and others affected by persistently poor air quality from smoke and ash.

References

External links
 Google Map of Fire Area
Set of Google Maps enhanced by MODIS, which reads fire/heat by satellite, and video by helicopter from KSBY TV, by Doc Searls
Time-lapse photos of fire, by a local resident (and evacuee)

2009 California wildfires
History of Santa Barbara County, California
Santa Ynez Mountains
Wildfires in Santa Barbara County, California